Njeguši is a village in the Cetinje Municipality of southern Montenegro, located on the slopes of Mount Lovćen, within the Lovćen national park. It is part of the territory of Njeguši tribe.

Demographics
According to the 2003 census, the village had 17 inhabitants, of whom 15 declared as Montenegrins, 1 as Serb, and 1 Unknown. According to 2011 census, there were 35 inhabitants, 33 of whom were Montenegrins, one did not want to reveal ethnicity and one was a Russian.

References

Populated places in Cetinje Municipality